McCafé is a coffee-house-style food and beverage chain, owned by McDonald's. Conceptualised and launched in Melbourne, Australia, in 1993, and introduced to the public with help from McDonald's CEO Charlie Bell and then-chairman and future CEO James Skinner, the chain reflects a consumer trend towards espresso coffees.

Reports indicated that McCafé outlets generated 15% more revenue than a regular McDonald's and, by 2003, were the largest coffee shop brand in Australia and New Zealand. After McDonald's Australia experimented with automatic espresso-pronto machines in the last decade and it failed to catch on, all Australian stores were subsequently renovated and converted to McCafé outlets.

History
The McCafé concept was designed to help create atmosphere and foot-traffic at the entrance to the McDonald's stores on Swanston Street, Melbourne. The idea was developed between Charlie Bell and the local Regional Corporate team (David Bayes, Mike Tregurtha and Jim Vasiliadis).

International expansion

The chain spread to 13 countries by 2002, with the first one in the United States opened in Chicago, Illinois, in May 2001 when there were about 300 worldwide. In 2004 McCafé opened in Costa Rica and in France, and the next year, the concept was launched in Italy. In June 2006 the first McCafé in Bulgaria opened at the Mall of Sofia. In 2007, the chain expanded to Japan as part of McDonald's efforts to boost sales with healthier soup and sandwich offerings and reach out to new customers who favoured traditional coffee shops. Despite being a relatively small part of McDonald's overall strategy, there are 1,300 worldwide.

The first McCafé in Peru was opened in late 2006 in San Isidro, then it arrived in Paraguay in 2007.

In August 2008, McDonald's expanded their McCafé concept to South Africa, where the McDonald's franchise is already a household name and one of the largest fast-food chains in the country.
At the end of 2009 McCafé drinks were available at McDonald's restaurants in the United States.
McCafé opened in El Salvador on July 6, 2010, located in McDonald's restaurants in the Zona Rosa and Próceres Boulevard with the goal of providing the aroma, flavor and texture of 100% Salvadorian gourmet coffee.

McCafé opened in Madrid, Spain on June 28, 2008, located in McDonald's Montera restaurants.

In July 2010 the McCafé added real fruit smoothies to their drink list. In November 2010 they added mocha and hot chocolate to their drink list. In July 2011 they added Frozen Strawberry Lemonade and the Mango Pineapple Smoothie to the U.S. menu.

In 2011 McDonald's started expansion of McCafé in Ukraine. There are six McCafés in Kyiv, one in Lviv, one in Odesa, one in Dnipro and one in Kharkiv as of January 2014.

On November 7, 2011, McDonald's Canada launched McCafé across the nation after being available only in select stores prior to this announcement. With the introduction of McCafé in Canada, participating McDonald's stores have added mocha, cappuccino, espresso, americano, latte, iced latte, iced mocha and hot chocolate to their menus. With McCafé, McDonald's is now in direct competition with Coffee Time, Country Style, Second Cup, Starbucks, Tim Hortons, and Timothy's in the Canadian coffee market.

On June 16, 2012, McDonald's launched the first McCafé Malaysia in Kota Damansara, with a few others subsequently opening in the Bandar Utama, Subang Jaya, Titiwangsa, and Taman Connaught outlets – all located in Klang Valley as well as in Greenlane, Birch House, IJM Promenade and Penang International Airport – all in Penang.

In Turkey, McCafé operates under the name "McD Café". The first coffee shop opened in July 2012 at Sabiha Gökçen Airport. As of April 2016, there are eight Mcd Cafés on the Asian side of Istanbul, six on the European side, 3 in Antalya, 2 each in Adana and Kocaeli, and one each in Afyonkarahisar, Aksaray, Ankara and Kırşehir.

In December 2012, McDonald's announced that it would be bringing the McCafé brand and line of products to all of the McDonald's restaurants in the United Kingdom. This would include the addition of iced frappés and iced fruit smoothies, and a rebranding of the standard McDonald's coffee to "McCafé".

On October 14, 2013, McDonald's launched the first McCafé India in the South Mumbai area in Mumbai, Maharashtra.

McDonald's introduced a coffee line called "McCafé" nationwide in the United States. In August 2014, the company announced it was going to start to selling its coffee for home brewing in supermarkets across the United States. Manufactured and distributed in partnership with Kraft Foods, the coffee is available in prepackaged bags and K-Cups.

In December 2015, McDonald's Canada opened its first standalone McCafe store in Toronto Union Station's newly built York concourse area.

On March 20, 2018, the first McCafé in Minsk, Belarus, was opened. Another McCafé opened its doors in Minsk on June 24, 2018, and one more was planned to open by the end of 2018.

In 2019 McCafé opened in different cities of Pakistan.

The first McCafé in Finland opened in February 2022 in Järvenpää.

In May 2022 McCafé was opened in different cities of Norway.

See also

 List of coffeehouse chains

References

External links

McDonald's McCafé USA 
McCafé Australia 
McDonald's McCafé - U.S Hispanic Market Website
McDonald's of Western Washington, USA McCafe Website (archived page)

McDonald's subsidiaries
Fast-food franchises
Fast-food chains of the United States
Bakery cafés
Coffeehouses and cafés in Australia
Coffeehouses and cafés in the United States
Restaurants established in 1993
Multinational companies